The 2014 Asian Junior Women's Volleyball Championship held in the Taipei University Gymnasium and the Taipei Gymnasium, in Taipei, Taiwan from 16 July to 27 July 2014. It acted as the Asian qualifying tournament for the 2015 FIVB Women's Junior World Championship.

Venues
 Taipei Gymnasium, Taipei – Pool C, D and Classification 9th–15th
 University of Taipei, Taipei – Pool A, B and Final Round

Pools composition
The teams are seeded based on their final ranking at the 2012 Asian Junior Women's Volleyball Championship.

Preliminary round

Pool A

|}

|}

Pool B

|}

|}

Pool C

|}

|}

Pool D

|}

|}

Classification round
 The results and the points of the matches between the same teams that were already played during the preliminary round shall be taken into account for the classification round.

Pool E

|}

|}

Pool F

|}

|}

Pool G

|}

|}

Pool H

|}

|}

Classification 13th–15th

Semifinals

|}

13th place

|}

Classification 9th–12th

Semifinals

|}

11th place

|}

9th place

|}

Final round

Quarterfinals

|}

5th–8th semifinals

|}

Semifinals

|}

7th place

|}

5th place

|}

3rd place

|}

Final

|}

Final standing

Awards
MVP:  Du Qingqing
Best Setter:  Lee Da-yeong
Best Outside Spikers:  Lee Jae-yeong and  Du Qingqing
Best Middle Blockers:  Hu Mingyuan and  Zhang Qian
Best Opposite Spiker:  Kaori Mabashi
Best Libero:  Park Hea-mi

See also
 List of sporting events in Taiwan

References

External links
AVC official website

2014
A
V
V
Asian women's volleyball championships
Asian Junior